Zealandornis (meaning "Zealandia bird") is an extinct genus of zealandornithid bird from the early Miocene Bannockburn Formation of Otago, New Zealand. The genus contains a single species, Zealandornis relictus, known from a distal right humerus.

Discovery and naming 
The Zealandornis holotype specimen, NMNZ S.52077, was discovered on the east bank of the Manuherikia River in a lower layer of the Bannockburn Formation in the Manuherikia Group, near St Bathans, Otago, New Zealand.

In 2022, Worthy et al. described Zealandornis relictus, a new extinct genus and species of bird. The generic name, "Zealandornis", combines a reference to the taxon's origin from Zealandia with the Greek "ὄρνις (ornis)", meaning "bird". The specific name, "relictus", refers to something that is "remaining" or "left behind".

Classification 
Zealandornis is a member of the monotypic family Zealandornithidae. This clade, erected with the description of Zealandornis, was likely a member of the Telluraves, with similarities to the Coliiformes.

References 

Extinct birds of New Zealand
Prehistoric bird genera
Fossil taxa described in 2022
Birds described in 2022